Live at the London Troxy is a live album by New Order, recorded on 10 December 2011 at The Troxy in London. The concert was released in both a 2-CD set and a 320kbit/s MP3 download. The download was made available on 21 December 2011, while the 2-CD set shipped the first week of January 2012.

This release was the first since the band decided to reunite with its new lineup, featuring the return of keyboardist Gillian Gilbert, and Tom Chapman replacing former bassist Peter Hook. The sold-out show was their first performance in London in over five years, and the album includes the entire performance. During their 90-minute set, New Order performed songs spanning 25 years of hits, alongside songs not played live since the 1980s ("586", "Age of Consent", "Elegia", "1963"), culminating with a rendition of Joy Division's "Love Will Tear Us Apart".

Track listing
All songs written by Bernard Sumner, Stephen Morris, Peter Hook and Gillian Gilbert, except where noted.

References

New Order (band) live albums
2011 live albums